The first USS Raritan was a wooden-hulled, three-masted sailing frigate of the United States Navy built at the Philadelphia Navy Yard, laid down in 1820, but not launched until 13 June 1843, sponsored by Commodore Frederick Engle.  She was one of the last sailing frigates of the United States Navy.

On 20 February 1844 the frigate, commanded by Captain Francis H. Gregory, cleared New York Harbor and sailed for the South Atlantic where she served as Commodore Daniel Turner's flagship until she returned to the United States in November 1845.

Based at Pensacola, Florida, Raritan then operated with the Home Squadron as it blockaded the east coast of Mexico and supported Army forces during the war with Mexico. As Commodore David Conner's flagship, she joined USS Potomac in landing 500 men at Point Isabel to reinforce that military depot in May 1846. During 1847, she participated in the landings at Veracruz in March; at Tuxpan in April; and at Tabasco in June.

Raritan then retired to Norfolk where she was laid up in ordinary during 1848. Active again in 1849, she served as flagship of the West Indies Squadron, then as flagship for the Home Squadron, and in 1850 was transferred to the Pacific to cruise between Panama and Cape Horn and as far west as the International Date Line. Raritan arrived at Valparaíso in June 1851. On 31 August, the British merchant ship Governor Davis ran aground in the Bogueron Passage. Attempts by Raritan to refloat her were unsuccessful and she was abandoned. Raritan returned to the United States in October 1852. On her arrival home, she was again laid up, in ordinary, at Norfolk. Raritan remained there until she was destroyed, 20 April 1861, by Union forces as they evacuated the navy yard.

See also

Union Navy
List of sailing frigates of the United States Navy

References

Bibliography

 Howard I. Chapelle, The History of the American Sailing Navy: The Ships and their Development (Norton, New York, 1949), p. 457, plan 29.

Mexican–American War ships of the United States
Ships built in Philadelphia
Sailing frigates of the United States Navy
Ships of the Union Navy
1843 ships
Shipwrecks of the American Civil War
Shipwrecks of the Virginia coast
Maritime incidents in April 1861